The 2012 Danmark Rundt was a men's road bicycle race held from 22 to 26 August 2012. It was the 22nd edition of the men's stage race, which was established in 1985. The race was rated as a 2.HC event and formed part of the 2012 UCI Europe Tour.

The race was won by Dutch rider Lieuwe Westra of the Vacansoleil–DCM team, with Ramūnas Navardauskas of Garmin–Sharp second and Manuele Boaro of Saxo Bank–Tinkoff Bank third.

The 2012 race was moved to the end of August from its usual start date at the beginning of the month because of a clash with the 2012 Olympic Games. Organisers believe that this led to less spectators viewing the race than in the past and plan for the 2013 edition to start following the 2013 Tour de France.

Schedule

Teams
17 teams were invited to the 2012 Danmark Rundt: 8 teams from the UCI ProTeams, 4 UCI Professional Continental Teams, 4 UCI Continental Teams along with a Danish national team under the Team Post Danmark name.

Stages

Stage 1
22 August 2012 – Randers to Randers, 

The stage started and ended in Randers, taking in a tour of the Djursland peninsula and passing through the town of Grenaa. A crash involving around half of the field occurred 3½km before the finish before being won by German rider André Greipel of the Lotto–Belisol team. Alexander Kristoff of Team Katusha finished second, with Theo Bos of Rabobank finishing third.

Organisers decided to award every rider the same time following the mass crash as the riders involved were part of the peloton at the time. This is usually only done if riders are within the 3 km mark at the end of the stage, a decision which attracted some criticism from Michael Rasmussen.

Stage 2

23 August 2012 – Løgstør to Aarhus, 

Stage two was the longest stage of the 2012 race, starting in Løgstør on the Limfjord and travelling generally south through Jutland. It passed through the town of Viborg before ending in Aarhus. It was described as a key stage with a possibly critical impact on the overall standings. The stage was won by André Greipel following a bunch sprint at the finish. Topsport Vlaanderen–Mercator rider Michael Van Staeyen finished second with Steele Von Hoff of Garmin–Sharp third.

Stage 3
24 August 2012 – Silkeborg to Vejle, 

Stage three has been described as the toughest stage in the race and contained the most climbs. The route initially ran north from Silkeborg through Kjellerup, before turning southwards through Silkeborg again before heading towards Vejle. It finished after the traditional climb of Kiddesvej, a 350-metre climb with an average gradient of 12.5% and a maximum gradient of 21%. This climb has been included in the Danmark Rundt each year since 2004.

After a breakaway, which at one point reached eight minutes, most riders rejoined the peloton before the final climb of Kiddesvej led to a small group being able to complete the stage ahead of the main bunch. The stage winner was Lars Petter Nordhaug of Team Sky who took over the general classification lead from André Greipel. Wilco Kelderman of Rabobank came second with Ramūnas Navardauskas of Garmin–Sharp third.

Stage 4
25 August 2012 – Ringe to Odense, 

A short stage to allow for an individual time trial later in the same day, stage four saw the race move to Funen. Starting in Ringe, the route traveled south to Faaborg on the south coast, before passing north to Odense. Much of the route was wet and, again, produced a sprint finish which was won by Alexander Kristoff of Team Katusha ahead of Andrew Fenn of Omega Pharma–Quick-Step and Theo Bos of Rabobank. Lars Petter Nordhaug retained the yellow jersey with just a one-second lead over Kristoff ahead of the evening individual time trial around Kerteminde.

Stage 5
25 August 2012 – Kerteminde to Kerteminde,  individual time trial (ITT)

Stage five was a 14½km individual time trial around Kerteminde on Funen. The stage was identical to the time trial used in the 2002 and 2008 races. It was won by Lieuwe Westra of the Vacansoleil–DCM team who took the yellow jersey, leading the race by ten seconds from Ramūnas Navardauskas.

Stage 6
26 August 2012 – Slagelse to Frederiksberg, 

Stage six started in Slagelse on Sjælland and passed through Sorø and Roskilde before arriving in Frederiksberg. Ten laps of 6 km each led to the traditional race finish on Frederiksberg Allé. The stage was won by Team Sky rider Mark Cavendish in a bunch sprint, with Lieuwe Westra retaining the overall lead.

Classification leadership

Final standings
The general classification was won by Lieuwe Westra of Vacansoleil–DCM by ten seconds from Ramūnas Navardauskas of Garmin–Sharp with Manuele Boaro of Saxo Bank–Tinkoff Bank another four seconds back in third place. Team Katusha rider Alexander Kristoff won the points trophy by one point from Lotto–Belisol rider André Greipel.

The mountain classification was won by Danish rider Nikola Aistrup of Team Concordia Forsikring–Himmerland with Dutch rider Wilco Kelderman of Team Rabobank winning the young riders award. Glud & Marstrand–LRØ rider Sebastian Lander won the fighters award. The team race was won by Team Sky.

References

External links

Official site (Danish)

Danmark Rundt
Danmark Rundt
2012 in Danish sport